"Go Go Power Rangers" is a song by Ron Wasserman who recorded it under the name Aaron Waters - The Mighty RAW. It was released by Saban Records, later renamed Saban Music Group of Saban Capital Group, on CD and cassette formats in the US on December 2, 1994, and in the UK December 14, 1994. The song serves as the opening theme for the first three seasons of the original Power Rangers series Mighty Morphin Power Rangers. It was composed using keyboard only, preloaded with guitar and drum sound since Ron Wasserman does not play either instrument. The song, with minor alterations of its lyrics, was also used for the mini-series Alien Rangers. The titular refrain, "Go Go Power Rangers!", has become a popular catchphrase associated with the show, and it has been used in several other themes for the series.

A cover of the song, performed by Noam Kaniel, was used as the show's intro theme from 2011 up to 2014, starting with the 18th season of the franchise, Power Rangers Samurai. A rearrangement of Kaniel's version was used for 2013's Power Rangers Megaforce, revising some lyrics to reflect that season. The lyrics "Go Go Power Rangers" were incorporated into otherwise-new theme songs for Power Rangers Dino Charge, Power Rangers Ninja Steel, Power Rangers Beast Morphers, and Power Rangers Dino Fury.

Track listing 
Cassette
 "Go Go Power Rangers (Euro Mix)"
 "Go Go Power Rangers (Original LP Long Version)"

1995 film version 

For the 1995 film adaptation Mighty Morphin Power Rangers: The Movie, a new arrangement of "Go Go Power Rangers" was recorded for the film's soundtrack. The song was performed by "The Power Rangers Orchestra": a collaboration that featured Mr. Big frontman Eric Martin, Guitarist Tim Pierce, former Pablo Cruise bass player John Pierce, singer-pianist Kim Bullard, and former Guns N' Roses drummer Matt Sorum.

2012 re-recording
In 2012, Wasserman re-recorded "Go Go Power Rangers", along with "the best known songs" from the first four seasons of Power Rangers, and released a digital album titled Power Rangers Redux to both his personal Bandcamp and iTunes. Of the album, Wasserman said, "The original recordings were done quickly to keep up with the production schedule...I wanted to use today's technology, and my additional 20+ years of experience as a producer, to 'punch up' the performances and energy to match today's sound."

Notable cover versions
 Norwegian metal singer, Leo Moracchioli covered the song along with Truls Haugen, which recorded the rock version of Power Rangers Dino Charge and Dino Super Charge.

Newer versions
The song, when used as the main theme for Power Rangers Samurai and Power Rangers Super Samurai, was performed by Noam Kaniel. Different arrangements, with some of the lyrics altered for each, were used for the subsequent series, including Power Rangers Megaforce and Power Rangers Super Megaforce; Power Rangers Dino Charge and Power Rangers Dino Super Charge; and Power Rangers Ninja Steel, all of which were also performed by Kaniel.

References 

Songs about fictional characters
1994 songs
Children's television theme songs
Mighty Morphin Power Rangers
Ron Wasserman songs